Mini 12 may refer to:
 2.4 Metre (keelboat), an open class single-handed yacht
 Illusion (keelboat), a one-design single-handed yacht
 Inspiron Mini 12, one of the Dell Inspiron Mini series of netbook computers